Radanje is a village in the municipality of Karbinci, North Macedonia.

Demographics
According to the 2002 census, the village had a total of 471 inhabitants. Ethnic groups in the village include:

Macedonians 318
Serbs 1
Turks 118
Aromanians 34

References

Villages in Karbinci Municipality